Is Homosexuality a Menace? A Revealing Examination of Sex Deviation by a Physician and Criminologist is a 1957 work about homosexuality by Arthur Guy Mathews. The work received negative reviews.

The book claimed that there were 7,000 homosexuals on the government payroll in each of Washington D.C. and New York City, with many of those in New York having come from Washington to work at the United Nations headquarters.

Reception
Is Homosexuality a Menace? received negative reviews from Joseph A. Moore in Mattachine Review, the journal of the Mattachine Society, and Frank Pendola in ONE magazine. Is Homosexuality a Menace? has been described an example of books that were used in the 1950s as part of the Lavender Scare campaign.

References

1957 non-fiction books
American non-fiction books
English-language books
Non-fiction books about same-sex sexuality